Turning on the Girls is a 2001 American comedic dystopian science fiction novel written by Cheryl Benard.

Plot
A decade ago women took over world and have changed everything, schools, language, women's and men's thinking. Lisa, a twenty-two-year-old who works at a government ministry dedicated to mental revolution, is given the task to update female sexual fantasies, which means no masochistic or romantic daydreams.  Not all men are pleased with this new world order and Harmony, an underground men's movement, plans a violent uprising to put things back the way they were, while Lisa and her assistant Justin are recruited to infiltrate Harmony.

References

English-language novels
Sexuality in novels
Books about women
American science fiction novels
2001 science fiction novels
American comedy novels
Dystopian novels
2001 American novels